Alpinia conchigera, the lesser alpinia, is a plant species in the genus Alpinia.

Cardamomin is a chalconoid isolated from A. conchigera.

References

External links

 Alpinia conchigera on zipcodezoo.com

conchigera